Slak (Iślaq) is a rural locality (a village) in Yeremeyevsky Selsoviet, Chishminsky District, Bashkortostan, Russia. The population was 111 as of 2010. There is 1 street.

Geography 
Slak is located 18 km west of Chishmy (the district's administrative centre) by road. Bashterma is the nearest rural locality.

References 

Rural localities in Chishminsky District